Hamilton de Souza (born 27 September 1968 in Passos, Minas Gerais), better known as Careca or Careca II, is a former Brazilian footballer who played as a striker.

Careca II played for several Brazilian clubs as Cruzeiro, Atlético Mineiro and Coritiba and also for Sporting CP in Portugal.

Careca competed for Brazil at the 1988 Summer Olympics. In the first round, he started three times in the front line with the famed Romário but did not score and was each time substituted for Bebeto. Careca also played each of Brazil's three games in the knock-out stages and won the silver medal, after Brazil lost the final against the Soviet Union.

Careca II played four games for the Brazil national football team but did not score.

In 2008, he served as assistant coach of the youth team of Atlético Mineiro.

Personal life
In July 2015, his son Hamilton de Souza Junior, signed a contract to play for Biu Chun Rangers in the 2015–16 Hong Kong Premier League.

References

External links 
 
 
 
 
 

1968 births
Living people
Brazilian footballers
Olympic footballers of Brazil
Association football forwards
Footballers at the 1988 Summer Olympics
Olympic silver medalists for Brazil
Brazilian expatriate footballers
Cruzeiro Esporte Clube players
Associação Atlética Ponte Preta players
Clube Atlético Mineiro players
Londrina Esporte Clube players
Coritiba Foot Ball Club players
Vila Nova Futebol Clube players
América Futebol Clube (MG) players
Sporting CP footballers
Expatriate footballers in Portugal
Olympic medalists in football
Place of birth missing (living people)
Pan American Games gold medalists for Brazil
Medalists at the 1988 Summer Olympics
Pan American Games medalists in football
Footballers at the 1987 Pan American Games
Medalists at the 1987 Pan American Games